Joachim Simon (known as Shushu) (1919–1943) was a Jewish-German leader of a rescue movement during World War II. Simon, along with Joop Westerweel, led a group called the Westerweel Group.

References

Jews in the German resistance
German Jews who died in the Holocaust
Year of birth missing